"Hotel" is a song by Australian singer songwriter Kita Alexander. The song is track 1 on Alexander's extended play Hotel. 
The music video was released on 31 August 2017 The Arty Remix was released on 22 September 2017 and was sent to radio as the EPs second single. "Hotel" peaked at number 51 on the ARIA Singles Chart and was certified 2xplatinum in 2020.

Track listing

Charts

Certification

Release history

References

2017 singles
2017 songs
Kita Alexander songs
Song recordings produced by Dann Hume
Songs written by Dann Hume
Songs written by Kita Alexander
Warner Music Australasia singles